Lithuanian Athletics Championships is the national championship in athletics, organized by the Athletic Federation of Lithuania. The first competition was held in 1921. Women participated since the 1922 championship.

Championships 

1st, 1921, Kaunas
2nd, 1922, Kaunas
3rd, 1923, Kaunas
4th, 1924, Kaunas
5th, 1926, Kaunas
6th, 1927, Klaipėda
7th, 1928, Kaunas
8th, 1929, Klaipėda
9th, 1930, Kaunas
10th, 1931, Kaunas
11th, 1932, Klaipėda
12th, 1933, Kaunas
13th, 1934, Klaipėda
14th, 1935, Kaunas
15th, 1936, Klaipėda
16th, 1937, Kaunas
17th, 1938, Kaunas
18th, 1939, Kaunas
19th, 1942, Kaunas
20th, 1943, Kaunas
21st, 1945, Kaunas
22nd, 1946, Kaunas
23rd, 1947, Kaunas
24th, 1948, Vilnius
25th, 1949, Vilnius
26th, 1950, Vilnius
27th, 1951, Vilnius
28th, 1952, Vilnius
29th, 1953, Klaipėda
30th, 1954, Vilnius
31st, 1955, Vilnius
32nd, 1956, Vilnius
33rd, 1957, Vilnius
34th, 1958, Vilnius
35th, 1959, Vilnius
36th, 1960, Vilnius
37th, 1961, Vilnius
38th, 1962, Vilnius
39th, 1963, Vilnius
40st, 1964, Vilnius
41st, 1965, Vilnius
42nd, 1966, Panevėžys
43rd, 1967, Panevėžys
44th, 1968, Vilnius
45th, 1969, Vilnius
46th, 1970, Vilnius
47th, 1971, Vilnius
48th, 1972, Vilnius
49th, 1973, Vilnius
50th, 1974, Vilnius
51st, 1976, Vilnius
52nd, 1977, Kaunas
53rd, 1978, Vilnius
54th, 1979, Vilnius
55th, 1980, Vilnius
56th, 1981, Vilnius
57th, 1982, Vilnius
58th, 1983, Vilnius
59th, 1984, Klaipėda
60th, 1985, Vilnius
61st, 1986, Kaunas
62nd, 1987, Vilnius
63rd, 1988, Vilnius
64th, 1989, Vilnius
65th, 1990, Vilnius
66th, 1991, Vilnius
67th, 1992, Vilnius
68th, 1993, Vilnius
69th, 1994, Vilnius
70th, 1995, Vilnius
71st, 1996, Vilnius
72nd, 1997, Kaunas
73rd, 1998, Kaunas
74th, 1999, Kaunas
75th, 2000, Kaunas
76th, 2001, Kaunas
77th, 2002, Kaunas
78th, 2003, Kaunas
79th, 2004, Kaunas
80th, 2005, Kaunas
81st, 2006, Kaunas
82nd, 2007, Kaunas
83rd, 2008, Kaunas
84th, 2009, Kaunas
85th, 2010, Kaunas
86th, 2011, Kaunas
87th, 2012, Kaunas
88th, 2013, Šiauliai
89th, 2014, Kaunas
90th, 2015, Palanga
91st, 2016, Palanga
92nd, 2017, Palanga
93rd, 2018
94th, 2019
95th, 2020, Palanga
96th, 2021, Palanga
97th, 2022, Palanga

Events 

Men
100 m
200 m
400 m
800 m
1500 m
5000 m
10000 m
110 m hurdles
400 m hurdles
3000 m steeplechase
High Jump
Pole Vault
Long Jump
Triple Jump
Shot Put
Discus Throw
Javelin Throw
Hammer Throw
4 × 100 m
4 × 400 m

Women
100 m
200 m
400 m
800 m
1500 m
5000 m
10000 m
100 m hurdles
400 m hurdles
3000 m steeplechase
High Jump
Pole Vault
Long Jump
Triple Jump
Shot Put
Discus Throw
Javelin Throw
Hammer Throw
4 × 100 m
4 × 400 m

In past there was 20 km and 20000 m walking, 2000 m steeplechase, 60 metres, decathlon and heptathlon events.

Championship records
Records set since 1921

Men

Women

References

External links
Lithuanian athletics (old)
Lithuanian athletics (new)

 
Recurring sporting events established in 1921
1921 establishments in Lithuania
Annual events in Lithuania
National athletics competitions
Athletics competitions in Lithuania
Summer events in Lithuania